Maria Mordasova (née Yarkina, 1915—1997) was a Russian singer, known for her renditions of folk song and chastushkas. She was honoured as a People's Artist of the USSR in 1981 and Hero of Socialist Labour and the Order of Lenin in 1987.

Early life
Maria Nikolaevna Yarkina was born on 14 February 1915 in the village of Nizhnyaya Mazovka in Tambov Province, one of several children in a peasant family. Her mother, Praskovia Prokofievna, was an acclaimed local singer.

Yarkina performed in the school choir and in the village club. Even as a schoolchild, she worked as a milkmaid. After finishing school, she joined an amateur theatrical group in Tambov.

Before the Second World War, she was married and widowed. Having taken her husband's surname, she would henceforth be called Maria Mordasova. In 1945, she married the Voronezh chorus' accordionist, I.M. Rudenko. The marriage was a personal and professional success.

Career
Mordasova moved to Voronezh to work in a textile factory. In the winter of 1942-1943, the Voronezh Russian Folk Chorus was established, of which she was one of the first members. Until 1972, she was its soloist.

Mordasova began to compile Chastushkas, fast-paced traditional Russian songs. She composed nearly 300 chastushkas as well. A performer of outstanding ability, she became very popular in the region.

Following World War II, Mordasova began to tour the Soviet Union.

In 1972, Mordasova joined the Voronezh Regional Philharmonic, leading the choral ensemble.

Later life
Mordasova retired from singing in 1982 and began to write her memoirs. But retirement did not suit her and she fell into depression. When her husband fell seriously ill and into a coma, she suffered a nervous breakdown.

She died in Voronezh on 25 September 1997, and was interred in the Kominternovsk cemetery in the same town.

"Maria Mordasova Apartment-Museum", a museum in her name was established in Voronezh in 2005 in the apartment she had lived in.

Honours
 Honoured Artist of the RSFSR, 1955
 People’s Artist of the RSFSR, 1958
 People's Artist of the USSR, 1981
 Hero of Socialist Labour, 1987
 Order of Lenin, 1987
 Order of the Badge of Honour

References

External links
 

Russian folk singers
1915 births
1997 deaths
Soviet women singers
Heroes of Socialist Labour
Recipients of the Order of Lenin
People's Artists of the USSR
People's Artists of the RSFSR
Honored Artists of the RSFSR
20th-century Russian women singers
20th-century Russian singers